Directions Home (Songs We Love, Songs You Know) is the sixteenth album and tenth studio album by Christian group Point of Grace. It was released on April 7, 2015.

Critical reception

Awarding the album three and a half stars for CCM Magazine, Andy Argyrakis lauded "the instantly appealingly, earthy nature of this faith-filled nurturing collection." Kevin Davis, giving the album four stars at New Release Today, wrote, "really engaged by the emotional vocals and the prayerful lyrics found in these sacred songs." Felicia Abraham, reviewing the album for Charisma, noted that Point of Grace made the album "without conforming to the restraints of any given genre."

Rating the album four stars from Christian Music Review, Kelly Meade says, "Point Of Grace makes a solid effort with these tracks giving us an album that not only is pleasant to the ear but also thought-provoking calling the attention towards our Creator." Joshua Andre, in a four-star review for 365 Days of Inspiring Media, wrote, "Directions Home is an album to be savored, and listened to again and again." In a four-star review at Christian Review Magazine, Leah St. John wrote, "their vocals really shine on Directions Home."

Track listing

Personnel 

Point of Grace
 Shelley Breen – vocals 
 Leigh Cappillino – vocals 
 Denise Jones – vocals 

Musicians
 Blair Masters – acoustic piano, dulcimer
 Mike Rojas – acoustic piano, organ, synthesizers 
 Roger Ryan – acoustic piano, vocal arrangements
 Jeff Taylor – acoustic piano, accordion, pump organ, penny whistle
 Scott Denté – acoustic guitar 
 Stuart Dill – acoustic guitar 
 Bryan Sutton – acoustic guitar 
 Jeff King – electric guitar 
 Jerry McPherson – electric guitar 
 Rob Ickes – guitars, dobro, Weissenborn lap steel guitar
 Andy Leftwich – banjo, fiddle, mandolin, violin 
 Ricky Skaggs – mandolin (9), vocals (9), narrator ( 9)
 Mark Hill – electric bass 
 Byron House – electric bass, upright bass 
 Steve Brewster – drums, percussion, programming 
 Matt Slocum – cello 
 Vince Gill – vocals (3)
 Rachel Leftwich – vocal arrangements

Production 
 Point of Grace – producers (1, 2, 3, 5-9)
 Andy Leftwich – producer (1, 2, 3, 5-9)
 Stuart Dill – producer (4), executive producer 
 Roger Ryan – producer (10)
 Nicole Curtis – A&R 
 Jamie Hayes – A&R
 Richie Biggs – engineer, mixing 
 Jasper Lemaster – engineer 
 Jeff Pitzer – engineer 
 Ainslie Grosser – mixing 
 Mark Capps – vocal recording 
 Matt Rausch – vocal recording for Vince Gill (3)
 Andrew Darby – assistant engineer
 Steve Dewey – assistant engineer
 Andrew Mendelson – mastering at Georgetown Masters (Nashville, Tennessee).
 Natthaphol Abhigantaphand – mastering assistant 
 Adam Grover – mastering assistant 
 Ceele Dennis – production assistant
 Shane Tarleton – creative director 
 Katherine Petillo – art direction, design
 Robby Klein – photography

Chart performance

Awards and nominations
In 2015, the album was nominated for a Dove Award for 'Bluegrass/Country Album of the Year'. It was also nominated for a Grammy Award for 'Best Roots Gospel Album' in 2016.

References

2015 albums
Point of Grace albums
Word Records albums